Jahnstadion is a former multi-use stadium in Marl, Germany. It was used as the stadium of TSV Marl-Hüls association football matches.  The capacity of the stadium is 25,000 spectators.

It has been used exclusively for baseball since 2008. The former main grandstand is now adjacent to left field, with home plate situated near the former opposite grandstand and the farthest point from home plate in fair territory being in right center field.

External links
 Stadium information

Defunct football venues in Germany
Defunct sports venues in Germany
Buildings and structures in Recklinghausen (district)
Sports venues in North Rhine-Westphalia